The pale-tailed canastero (Asthenes huancavelicae), is a species of bird in the family Furnariidae.  It is found in South America in south-central Peru.

Taxonomy and systematics
The pale-tailed canastero was originally described as a subspecies of the rusty-vented canastero and some authorities still consider it as such. Alternate names for the pale-tailed canastero include the Huancavelica canastero and white-tailed canastero.

Subspecies
Two subspecies of the pale-tailed canastero are recognized:
  Asthenes huancavelicae usheri - Morrison, 1947: Found in Apurimac (south-central Peru). Considered as vulnerable by the IUCN.
  Asthenes huancavelicae huancavelicae - Morrison, 1938: Found in Ancash, Huancavelica and Ayacucho (western and south-central Peru)

References

pale-tailed canastero
Birds of the Peruvian Andes
Endemic birds of Peru
pale-tailed canastero